Khoksa is a small town eastern Kushtia District, Bangladesh.This town serves as the headquarter of Khoksa Upazila.

Geography
Khoksa is located at approximately 23.806°N 89.284°E. It has 16,424 households and a total area of 99.17 km2.

Demography
According to the 1991 Bangladesh census, Khoksa had a population of 93,371. Males constituted 51.65% of the population, and females 48.35%. The population aged 18 or over was 47,024. Khoksa had an average literacy rate of 25.2% (7+ years), compared to the national average of 32.4%.[1]
Unions: Khoksa, Osmanpur, Betbaria, Janipur, Shimulia, Somospur & Gopgram.

Education
Educational Institutions: The town has a number of educational institutions. Alhaj Saidur Rahman Mantu Mahila Degree College,  Khokha University College and Khoksa-Janipur Pilot High School, Khoksa-Janipur Girls High School, Shimulia High School are mentionable. These educational institutions have glorious history and reputation. Students of these institutions are making brilliant results in public examinations.

Cultural
Janipur is the house of annual Hindu Kali Pooja festival in Bangladesh. Hindus from all over Bangladesh and some are from abroad come to attend this religious festival.there are many cultural events are organised throughout the year. Many scholars were also born in this place like Saktipada pPal, Altafur Rahman, Rabindranath Biswas, Dijendranath Biswas and many more. Khoksa College was established by these people.

Economy
The economy of this upazila is mostly agriculture oriented. Khoksa has a railway station called "Khoksa station" and It Has a Bus Stand Also......

Gorai
Former Gorai River runs along the west side of the town, including the famous island "Guchchho Gram".

References

Populated places in Khulna Division